Taywara Airport  is a public use airport located near Taywara, Ghōr, Afghanistan.

See also
List of airports in Afghanistan

References

External links 
 Airport record for Taywara Airport at Landings.com. Retrieved 2013-8-1

Airports in Afghanistan
Ghor Province